Aleksandr Porkhomovskiy (born 12 August 1972) is a Russian-born Israeli sprinter.

His personal best in the 100 meters is 10.12, set in Russia on July 14, 1994. He competed five times at World Athletics Championships in 1993 (semi finalist), 1995 (quarter finalist), 1997 (quarter finalist), 1999 (quarter finalist) and 2001 (quarter finalist).

He is the Israeli national record holder at 100 meters and 60 meters and was former Russian record holder at 100 meters U23. In 1999 he became an Israeli athlete. He retired in 2003.

Personal Best
Outdoor
100 meters - 10.12 s (1994)
200 meters - 20.35 s (1994)
Indoor
60 meters - 6.59 s (1994)

See also
List of 100 metres national champions (men)

References

External links
 

1972 births
Living people
Russian male sprinters
Israeli male sprinters
Olympic male sprinters
Olympic athletes of Israel
Athletes (track and field) at the 2000 Summer Olympics
Goodwill Games medalists in athletics
Competitors at the 1994 Goodwill Games
Universiade medalists in athletics (track and field)
Universiade silver medalists for Russia
Medalists at the 1997 Summer Universiade
World Athletics Championships athletes for Israel
World Athletics Championships athletes for Russia
European Athletics Championships medalists
Russian Athletics Championships winners